Ceratocystis zombamontana is a plant-pathogenic saprobic fungal species first found in Africa, infecting Acacia mearnsii and Eucalyptus species.

References

Further reading
Nkuekam, Gilbert Kamgan, Michael J. Wingfield, and Jolanda Roux. "Ceratocystis species, including two new taxa, from Eucalyptus trees in South Africa." Australasian Plant Pathology 42.3 (2013): 283–311.
De Beer, Z. W., et al. "Redefining Ceratocystis and allied genera." Studies in Mycology 79 (2014): 187–219.
Van Wyk, Marelize, et al. "New Ceratocystis species infecting coffee, cacao, citrus and native trees in Colombia." Fungal Diversity 40.1 (2010): 103–117.

External links
 MycoBank

Fungal plant pathogens and diseases
Microascales
Fungi described in 2009